Sunday Silence (March 25, 1986 – August 19, 2002) was an American-bred Thoroughbred racehorse and sire. In 1989, he won the Kentucky Derby and the Preakness Stakes but failed to complete the Triple Crown when he was defeated in the Belmont Stakes. Later in the same year, he won the Breeders' Cup Classic and was voted American Champion Three-Year-Old Colt and American Horse of the Year. Sunday Silence's racing career was marked by his rivalry with Easy Goer, whom he had a three to one edge over in their head-to-head races.   Easy Goer, the 1988 American Champion Two-Year-Old Colt finished second to Sunday Silence in the Kentucky Derby by  lengths and the Preakness by a nose then in the Breeders' Cup Classic by a neck. Easy Goer prevailed by eight lengths in the Belmont. Both horses were later voted into the American Hall of Fame.

After his retirement from racing, Sunday Silence attracted little support by breeders in the United States and was exported to Japan. He was the Leading Sire in Japan on thirteen occasions, surpassing the previous record of ten titles by Northern Taste. Although the relatively insular nature of Japanese racing at the time meant that Sunday Silence's success was initially restricted to his home territory, his descendants have in recent years won major races in Australia, France, the United Kingdom, Hong Kong, the United States and Dubai. Blood-Horse pedigree expert Anne Peters speculated, "Had Sunday Silence retired in Kentucky, it's almost certain he would have tanked commercially and been exported in disgrace, but he found his perfect gene pool and thrived instead." He was also the leading broodmare sire in North America in 2016 due to his grandson Lani’s qualification of entry in the Kentucky Derby that year with a Grade II win in Dubai, followed by off the board finishes in the Derby and Preakness, and a third-place finish in the Belmont. Once qualified to appear on the broodmare sire list, Sunday Silence then got enhancements from his Japanese runners, where there is a substantial disproportion between North American purses and the significantly higher purses in Japan.

In the Blood-Horse magazine List of the Top 100 U.S. Racehorses of the 20th Century, Sunday Silence was ranked #31.

Early years
Sunday Silence was foaled on March 25, 1986 at Stone Farm in Paris, Kentucky. He was sired by Halo out of Wishing Well by Understanding. Though he was registered as a dark bay/brown, he was in fact a true black. He was bred by Oak Cliff Thoroughbreds, Ltd. and escaped death twice: first as a weanling when he nearly died from a freak virus; and later at age two, traveling in a van when the driver experienced a heart attack and the van flipped over. He was passed over twice at the sales ring as a yearling before he was sold in California for $50,000 as a two-year-old in training. Arthur B. Hancock III bought him as a "buy-back" (he had bred him), hoping to ship him to Kentucky. However, the van accident kept Sunday Silence in California. Hall of Fame trainer Charlie Whittingham bought a half share of the colt and then sold half of that to Dr. Ernest Gaillard. (Ownership designate: H-G-W Partners.)

Ownership
H-G-W Partners (Hancock-Gaillard-Whittingham) represents the names of the three partners who owned the horse.The three partners were:
 Arthur B. Hancock III (b. 1943) - 50% partner who is a horse breeder and the owner of Stone Farm near Paris, Kentucky;
 Charlie Whittingham (1913-1999) - 25% partner who was the horse's Hall of Fame trainer;
 Dr. Ernest Gaillard (1913-2004) - 25% partner, 1938 graduate of the University of Louisville and active in the organizing of the Kentucky Derby race, and a medical doctor with the Eighth Army Air Forces during World War II.

Racing record

1988: two-year-old season
Although Sunday Silence showed ability, he didn't make it to the races until late in his two-year-old season, finishing second in a maiden race, then winning a maiden special weight race and finishing second in an allowance race from three starts.

1989: three-year-old season
Sunday Silence began his three-year-old year by winning an allowance race. He then won the San Felipe Stakes and the Santa Anita Derby to qualify for a start in the Kentucky Derby.

Kentucky Derby
In the buildup to the 1989 Triple Crown, a rivalry developed between the West Coast-based Sunday Silence and the East Coast-based Easy Goer, winner of the 1988 Eclipse Award for best two-year-old colt. The two first met in the 1989 Kentucky Derby, run on May 6, with Easy Goer going into the Derby off only 13 days' rest running previously in the Wood Memorial, run on April 22; and with Sunday Silence going into the Derby off four weeks' rest running prior in the Santa Anita Derby, run on April 8. In the -mile Kentucky Derby, the first leg of the Triple Crown, Sunday Silence and jockey Pat Valenzuela defeated Easy Goer by  lengths over a muddy track in the slowest time (2:05) for a Kentucky Derby since 1958.  Daily Racing Form writer Dan Illman stated after Sunday Silence's victory that "the best horse won that afternoon." Daily Racing Form chairman Steve Crist stated his opinion that "Easy Goer had a legitimate explanation for his defeat, as he didn't handle the muddy Churchill track."

Preakness Stakes
While both horses were preparing for the -mile Preakness two weeks after the Derby, each had minor ailments. Sunday Silence came up dead lame after a gallop 7 days before the race. Trainer Whittingham contacted well-known Kentucky veterinarian Dr. Alex Harthill, who diagnosed a bruise under the sole, a common injury that "wasn't a serious problem but it had happened at a serious time." Harthill had Sunday Silence step on a clean sheet of white paper which was subsequently faxed to Dr. Ric Redden of Lexington, Kentucky, and from which Redden prepared a set of aluminum bar shoes. Redden and his assistant then flew via rented jet to Baltimore with the bar shoes and X-ray machine to confirm that no fracture was involved. After the shoes were fitted, Sunday Silence resumed training 4 days before the race. After his connections saw the colt's "remarkably" rapid recovery from the injury, the bar shoes were removed the day before the race.

Meanwhile, at his rival's stable, throughout Preakness week (as late as Friday, the day before the race), Easy Goer's front feet were being soaked in tubs of Epsom salts due to small scratches or cracks on both heels. An ultrasound was also performed on his ankles and knees. Some wondered if these ailments could compromise the chances of both horses. Easy Goer had "problematic, puffy" ankles that he dealt with throughout his career. Trainer Thad Ackel (trained Breeders' Cup Turf winner Great Communicator) stated, "Easy Goer has got a couple of osselets (enlargements of the fetlock joints usually caused by excess fluid), and it looked to me like there's some calcification there. I was surprised that such a good horse could have ankles like that."

Sunday Silence again prevailed over his arch-rival, this time by a nose, in a head-and-head battle down the home stretch. This race has been proclaimed by many experts to be the "Race of the Half Century." Some Easy Goer loyalists in the media maintained their horse's superiority, attributing the loss to the fact that Easy Goer had leapt in the air at the start and his jockey, Pat Day, reined Easy Goer's head to the right when he had a short lead in the home stretch. Day, who lodged a failed objection against Valenzuela, has called his ride "a mistake." Bill Christine of the Los Angeles Times and trainer Shug McGaughey also expressed their opinions on the mistakes they thought Day made during the race.

Belmont Stakes
During that era, New York was the only state in America that banned all race-day drugs and medications; New York didn't allow horses to race on any drugs, while the rest of the country did. During the three weeks between the Preakness and Belmont Stakes, the trainer of Sunday Silence, Charlie Whittingham, was angered that the controversial veterinarian Alex Harthill, who treated Sunday Silence earlier for the Kentucky Derby and Preakness, was not licensed in New York and prohibited from practicing. The day before the -mile Belmont Stakes, known as the "Run of the Carnations" and "Test of a Champion", Sunday Silence, with exercise rider Pam Mabes up, was spooked and kicked trainer Whittingham in the temple, a glancing blow that came close to killing the trainer. The Belmont track, which received several inches of rain in the days leading up to the race, was rated fast with Sunday Silence the 9:10 post time favorite, and the entry of Easy Goer and Awe Inspiring at 8:5.

Easy Goer defeated Sunday Silence by eight lengths in the time of 2:26, producing the second-fastest Belmont Stakes in history, behind only Secretariat, and denied Sunday Silence the Triple Crown.  By virtue of his two Classic wins and his runner-up performance, Sunday Silence was awarded the third $1,000,000 Visa Triple Crown Bonus for best three-year-old in the series.

Breeders' Cup Classic
After the Belmont Stakes, Sunday Silence finished second to eventual Breeders' Cup Turf winner Prized in the Grade II -mile Swaps Stakes on July 23, and won the Grade I Super Derby on September 24, giving him six weeks' rest going into the Breeder's Cup Classic. Easy Goer won 4 successive Grade I stakes after the Belmont, consisting of (in chronological order) the 1⅛-mile Whitney Handicap, -mile Travers Stakes, -mile Woodward Stakes and -mile Jockey Club Gold Cup, with three of those wins against older horses, and giving him 27 days' rest going into the Classic.

This set up one final face-off between Easy Goer and Sunday Silence at the season-ending $3 million -mile Breeders' Cup Classic at Gulfstream Park, run on November 4. The contest was expected to decide the winner of the Eclipse Award for Horse of the Year. Sunday Silence's jockey Pat Valenzuela had earlier been suspended for cocaine use and was replaced by Chris McCarron. Sunday Silence was the post time 2:1 second choice behind Easy Goer at 1:2. In the early part of the race, Sunday Silence was 5 lengths behind the leader and Easy Goer was 11 lengths from the front.  With 3 furlongs remaining, Sunday Silence was 4 lengths behind the leader and half a length ahead of Easy Goer. Daily Racing Form chart caller noted that Sunday Silence "went after Blushing John approaching the stretch, headed that rival just inside the final furlong, lugged in slightly while edging away and turned back Easy Goer under good handling and Won driving" to win by a neck over Easy Goer. The chart also noted that Easy Goer "lost his position when he tried to head towards the gap leaving the chute, advanced quickly from the outside to reach contention nearing the end of the backstretch, wasn't able to stay with the leaders while continuing wide around the far turn, then finished boldly."

At this point, Sunday Silence had earned what was then a single-season record $4.59 million and won seven times in nine starts for the 1989 campaign, earning him Eclipse Award for Outstanding 3-Year-Old Male Horse and Horse of the Year honors. For the latter award, Sunday Silence received 223 of 242 votes, making him the most decisive winner since John Henry eight years earlier.

However, this award did not settle the debate over which three-year-old was the better horse. Steve Crist stated in the New York Times that had the question on the ballot been, "’Who is the better horse, Sunday Silence or Easy Goer?’ a lot more than 19 would have voted against Sunday Silence," but also said, "by any standards last year [1989] belonged to Sunday Silence." Crist concluded, "Easy Goer was a great horse and so was Sunday Silence. I still think Easy Goer had more pure, raw talent. Paul Moran of the Los Angeles Times and Newsday agreed, stating that "Sunday Silence is Horse of the Year, but most still believe Easy Goer is the better horse."

In 1996, Sunday Silence was inducted into the National Museum of Racing and Hall of Fame. He was ranked #31 in the Bloodhorse Top 100 Horses of the 20th Century, while Easy Goer ranked #34. Blood-Horse stated that its rankings "will generate debate for years to come." The electoral friction was ultimately reflected in the introduction to the Blood-Horse's "Top 100 Racehorses" book, which said, "For all the work and dreaming that went into it... one approaches the list... with a nagging sense of its folly as a rational exercise and of the maddening arbitrariness of its outcome. However, one views this list of horses, whether in peace and contentment—or shock and dismay—all such judgments, of course, are entirely subjective, a mixture of whim, wisdom, and whatever prejudices howl through the back of the mind."

Since the Breeders’ Cup Classic was instituted in 1984, Alysheba and Sunday Silence were the only two horses to win three legs of a four-race sequence that was defined in 2015 as the Grand Slam of Thoroughbred racing: The Triple Crown races, plus the Breeders' Cup Classic, and Sunday Silence was the first horse to win three legs of the modern Grand Slam in the same year. As the Breeders' Cup began after the 1978 Triple Crown win of Affirmed, the potential for a sweep of all four races only became possible in 1984, and did not occur until 2015 when American Pharoah won the Triple Crown and eventually the Grand Slam.

1990: four-year-old season
At the age of four, Sunday Silence won the Californian and placed second in the Hollywood Gold Cup behind Criminal Type. He suffered an injured ligament that eventually led to his retirement. Out of 14 career races, he won nine and placed second in the other five.

Stud record

Sunday Silence was sold to Japanese breeder Zenya Yoshida, to stand at his Shadai Stallion Station in Shiraoi, Hokkaido. Yoshida had acquired a 25% interest in Sunday Silence early in his 4-year-old season and bought out the other partners for $7.5 million in 1991.

Sunday Silence flourished in Japan and became their leading sire from 1995 through 2008, taking over from Northern Taste (ten-time leading sire in Japan). He was particularly successful with daughters from the Northern Dancer sire line. However, breeders were generally not successful expanding his influence outside of Japan. His progeny have won many races in Japan, including 20 out of 22 JRA Grade 1 flat races (the only exceptions are the NHK Mile Cup and the Japan Cup Dirt). His progeny also have won International Grade 1 race including the Hong Kong Vase, Hong Kong Mile and Dubai Sheema Classic.

Descendants of Sunday Silence have broken many earnings records, in part because he was active at the start of the "big crop" era (siring about 2000 foals) and also because the average purses in Japan are significantly higher than the rest of the world. Conservative estimates on the earnings of Sunday Silence descendants place the total near JPY 80 billion (approximately $730 million according to Equibase). To put earnings into proper perspective and for added context, breeders often look at the average earnings index (AEI), which compares the average earnings of a stallion's crop (either in a specific year or over his lifetime) to the average earnings of all sires in the same country over the same period. A stallion's career AEI can be found by looking up the pedigree of any of their offspring in the Jockey Club's online pedigree database, equineline.com. Sunday Silence's career AEI is 2.55. Some of the all-time leading American sires by AEI rankings are: Bold Ruler 7.73, Alydar 5.21, Nasrullah 5.16, Northern Dancer 5.14, Nijinsky II 4.74, Danzig 4.53, Mr. Prospector 4.25, Seattle Slew 4.12, Buckpasser 3.94, Storm Cat 3.93, A.P. Indy 3.74.

Major winners
c = colt, f = filly

Sire of sires

Many of Sunday Silence's sons have gone on to become successful breeding stallions, with at least seventeen of them siring Group or Grade I winners. These include:

 Fuji Kiseki sired Kane Hekili, Straight Girl, Sun Classique (Dubai Sheema Classic) and Isla Bonita.
 Dance in the Dark sired Delta Blues, the winner of Australia's Melbourne Cup.
 Stay Gold sired Orfevre, Gold Ship, Dream Journey (Takarazuka Kinen, Arima Kinen), Nakayama Festa, Fenomeno, Oju Chosan, Red Reveur (Hanshin Juvenile Fillies), Admire Lead (Victoria Mile), Rainbow Line, Win Bright and Indy Champ.
 Agnes Gold sired Silence Is Gold, Abu Dhabi, Mais Que Bonita, Abidjan, Antonella Baby, Ivar, Energia Fribby, Hevea, Honra Real, Nathan, Olympic Kremlin, Culo e Camicia, Olympic Jhonsnow, Orfeu Negro, Olympic Las Palmas, Janelle Monae, In Love, Online and Look Of Love.
 Divine Light sired Natagora.
 Special Week sired Toho Jackal (Kikuka Sho), Buena Vista and Cesario (Yūshun Himba, American Oaks, dam of Epiphaneia). 
 Manhattan Cafe sired Grape Brandy (February Stakes), Hiruno d'Amour (Tenno Sho), Jo Cappuccino (NHK Mile Cup) Red Desire (Shuka Sho) and Queens Ring (Queen Elizabeth II Commemorative Cup).
 Neo Universe sired Unrivaled (Satsuki Shō), Logi Universe and Victoire Pisa. Victoire Pisa in turn sired the Oka Sho winner Jeweler.
 Zenno Rob Roy sired Saint Emilion (Yūshun Himba)
 Daiwa Major sired Curren Black Hill (NHK Mile Cup), Major Emblem and Admire Mars.
 Hat Trick sired Dabirsim and King David (Jamaica Handicap).
 Deep Impact sired Gentildonna, Deep Brillante, Kizuna, Harp Star, A Shin Hikari, Makahiki, Shonan Pandora, Beauty Parlour (Poule d'Essai des Pouliches), Ayusan (Oka Sho), Verxina, Tosen Ra, Mikki Isle, Dee Majesty, Spielberg (Tennō Shō), Lachesis (Queen Elizabeth II Commemorative Cup), Danon Shark (Mile Championship), Shonan Adela, Danon Platina, Real Impact, Mikki Queen (Yūshun Himba, Shuka Sho), Marialite, Real Steel, Sinhalite, Danon Premium, Vivlos, Satono Diamond, Al Ain, Saxon Warrior, Study of Man, Fierement, Fierce Impact, Wagnerian, Gran Alegria, Roger Barows, Loves Only You, Contrail and Fancy Blue.
 Suzuka Phoenix sired Meiner Ho O (NHK Mile Cup)
 Gold Allure sired Espoir City, Smart Falcon (Tokyo Daishōten, Teio Sho, Kawasaki Kinen), Copano Rickey (February Stakes), Gold Dream (February Stakes), Chrysoberyl (Japan Cup Dirt, Champions Cup), and Naran Huleg.
 Heart's Cry sired Just A Way, Admire Rakti, Cheval Grand, Nuovo Record (Yūshun Himba), One And Only (Tokyo Yūshun), Lys Gracieux, Suave Richard, Yoshida, Time Flyer, Salios, and Do Deuce.
 Black Tide sired Kitasan Black
 Suzuka Mambo sired Meisho Mambo and Sambista (Champions Cup)

In addition to his sons, his daughter Sun is Up was the dam of 2014 Breeders' Cup Mile winner Karakontie. When Blood-Horse magazine started to include Japanese earnings in their stallion rankings in 2016, Sunday Silence was the leading broodmare sire of the year. In 2022, Gendarme (a grandson of Sunday Silence through his daughter Believe) won the G1 Sprinters Stakes, the same race his dam won in 2002.

Death
Sunday Silence died on August 19, 2002. He had been treated for laminitis for the previous 14 weeks and had developed an infection in one leg as well. He had been given a stronger dose of a different painkilling medication the previous day to provide him relief, and apparently as a result, he had become comfortable enough to lie down for the first time in a week. The following morning, he appeared unable to rise, and while veterinarians were discussing what to do, he died, apparently of heart failure.

Pedigree

Pop culture
In the horse racing game Derby Owners Club, Sunday Silence is one of the sires available to breed in the game. He is also pictured on one of the official game cards.

See also
 List of historical horses

References

1986 racehorse births
2002 racehorse deaths
Racehorses bred in Kentucky
Racehorses trained in the United States
Breeders' Cup Classic winners
Kentucky Derby winners
Preakness Stakes winners
Eclipse Award winners
American Thoroughbred Horse of the Year
United States Thoroughbred Racing Hall of Fame inductees
American Grade 1 Stakes winners
Thoroughbred family 3-e